Sandra is a 1965 drama film directed and co-written by Luchino Visconti, and starring Claudia Cardinale, Jean Sorel, and Michael Craig. A modern-day retelling of the Electra story, the film centers on the incestuous relationship between a young Italian woman (Cardinale) and her brother (Sorel), on her return to their ancestral home of Volterra. It premiered at the 26th Venice International Film Festival, where it won the Golden Lion.

Plot
Visconti's retelling of the Electra story starts with Sandra/Electra (Claudia Cardinale) returning to her ancestral home in Italy.  On the eve of an official ceremony commemorating the death of her Jewish father in a Nazi concentration camp, she revives an intimate involvement with her brother (Jean Sorel), which troubles her naive husband (Michael Craig).

As ever with Visconti, he is ambivalently drawn to the decadent society he is ostensibly criticising; and Armando Nannuzzi's camera lovingly caresses the creaking old mansion, set in a landscape of crumbling ruins, where the incestuous siblings determine to wreak revenge on the mother (Bell) and stepfather (Ricci) who supposedly denounced their father.

The title, culled from the poem "Le ricordanze" by Giacomo Leopardi, could be translated as 'Glimmering stars of the Great Bear', and has a strong resonance with the movie's plot:

English translation:

Cast
Claudia Cardinale ...  Sandra Dawdson
Jean Sorel ...  Gianni Wald-Luzzati
Michael Craig ...  Andrew Dawdson
Renzo Ricci...  Antonio Gilardini
Fred Williams ...  Pietro Formari
Amalia Troiani...  Fosca - maid
Marie Bell ...  Sandra's mother
Vittorio Manfrino
Renato Moretti
Giovanni Rovini
Paola Piscini
Isacco Politi
Ferdinando Scarfiotti ... party guest

Notes 
The movie was shot on location in Volterra, a Tuscan town fifty miles southwest of Florence. Casa Inghrami and the Palazzo Viti were both used as settings for the family mansion there.

It was initially reported that the principal actors would voice their own parts in the English-language version of the film. Ultimately though they were dubbed by others.

This is the third of four films Claudia Cardinale made with Visconti, after Rocco and His Brothers (1960) and The Leopard (1963), followed by Gruppo di famiglia in un interno (1974).

Awards
The film won the Golden Lion at the Venice Film Festival.

References

External links 

 

1965 drama films
1965 films
Italian black-and-white films
1960s Italian-language films
Films about Jews and Judaism
Films directed by Luchino Visconti
Golden Lion winners
Films set in Tuscany
Incest in film
Films with screenplays by Suso Cecchi d'Amico
1960s Italian films